The Red Deer Vipers are a Junior "B" Ice Hockey team based in Red Deer, Alberta, Canada. They are members of the North Division of the Heritage Junior B Hockey League (HJHL). They played their home games at Red Deer Arena until 2016 when it was torn down to be rebuilt. The Vipers played home games out of Red Deer's Collicutt Centre which only sat about 500 with standing room for a season & a half. In January 2018, the Vipers returned to downtown Red Deer to play in the new Servus Arena which seats about 1,300.

History  

The Red Deer Vipers are an original Heritage Junior B Hockey League team, named as the Red Deer Cowboys beginning in the 1987–88 HJHL season. Shortly after, the Red Deer Cowboys were renamed as the Red Deer Vipers. The Vipers are the 1989, 1999, 2004, 2017 & 2018 HJHL champions, the 2004 and 2006 Russ Barnes Trophy champions, and the 2006 Keystone Cup champions.

The Vipers historical rivals have been the Blackfalds Wranglers who reside a mere 10 minutes north of Red Deer. In recent years the Vipers have developed an intense rivalry with the Airdrie Thunder. The Vipers and Thunder have met in each of the last three post-seasons. In 2016 the Thunder beat the Vipers in seven games in the north semi-final. In 2017 the Vipers beat Airdrie in the north semi-final in six games. The Vipers beat Airdrie in six again in the 2018 north final.

Media
Since the 2016 HJHL playoffs, the Red Deer Vipers have taken it upon themselves to broadcast road games via internet radio. The first ever Vipers play-by-play broadcast was game five of the 2016 HJHL north semi-final against the Airdrie Thunder. Red Deer native Brady Sim called the game using an iPhone with a wifi connection, Periscope & an Xbox gaming headset. The Vipers defeated Airdrie in game five 2–1, but ultimately lost the series to Airdrie 4 games to three.

The Vipers would arrange to have Sim broadcast that year's provincial championships which the Vipers hosted. The Vipers then began broadcasting games on Mixlr.com, where the broadcasts can still be found today.

Season-by-season record

Note: GP = Games played, W = Wins, L = Losses, T = Ties, OTL = Overtime Losses, Pts = Points, GF = Goals for, GA = Goals against, PIM = Penalties in minutes

Russ Barnes Trophy
Alberta Jr B Provincial Championships

 2016 Hosts

Keystone Cup
Western Canadian Jr. B Championships(Northern Ontario to British Columbia)
Six teams in round robin play. 1st vs 2nd for gold/silver & 3rd vs. 4th for bronze.

NHL alumni  

Brad Leeb
Paul Manning
Derek Morris

Awards and trophies  
Keystone Cup
2005–06

Russ Barnes Trophy
2003–04, 2005–06

HJHL Championship
1988–89, 1998–99, 2003–04, 2016–17, 2017–18

See also
List of ice hockey teams in Alberta

References

External links
Official website of the Red Deer Vipers
Vipers Mixlr live page

Ice hockey teams in Alberta
Sport in Red Deer, Alberta
1987 establishments in Alberta
Ice hockey clubs established in 1987